Hindu Temple of Omaha is a Hindu Temple in Omaha and serves the Hindu population of the Omaha Metropolitan Area. Many members of the Hindu Temple of Omaha are in Medical, Engineering and Computer Science fields within the Omaha area. Several members are also students studying at University of Nebraska and Creighton University. 98% of the member population is of Indian descent with the remaining 2% being Nepalese.

History
Starting in the 1970s, Hindus started immigrating to Nebraska to be students at University of Nebraska-Lincoln and Omaha to work in Engineering and Medical Fields. The demand for an area to worship, resulted in informal gatherings in homes or rented rooms at convention centers. In 1993, The Hindu Temple of Omaha was created after an Italian restaurant was bought in West Omaha and work began on renovating it and redesigning it to serve as a Permanent Hindu Temple. On August 30, 2004, The temple was finished and a Pran Pristhista ceremony was held. In 2012, HT Omaha held a prayer for the victims of the 2012 Sikh Temple Shooting with dozens in attendance.

Design
After buying the abandoned Italian restaurant, the Hindu Temple hired 11 Indian sculptors to sculpt the exterior of the Hindu Temple. The total renovation and sculpting costs of the temple amounted to $1.2 Million. The temple has several pillars each adorned with a Hindu Deity. The Temple has an inner main Sanctrum that has a 2.5 Ton statue of Ganesha. The Temple also has a cafeteria, library, classroom, rooms for yoga and a prayer hall. The temple also has Sunday school classes and a youth group.

Charity 
Hindu Temple of Omaha has engaged in many notable charity acts such as raising $35,000 for earthquake victims in 2001 Gujarat earthquake. HT, Omaha also engages in holding an annual health fair to raise awareness of AIDS. The temple also attends several interfaith dialogues in Omaha, educating people about Hinduism and allows world religion classes to visit the temple regularly. In 2019, the Hindu Temple held a luncheon to fundraise $54,000 for the Mississippi River Floods of 2019 and presented the check to Governor Ricketts in a ceremony held at the Hindu Temple.

References 

Buildings and structures in Douglas County, Nebraska
Hinduism in the United States
Religious buildings and structures completed in 2004
2004 establishments in Nebraska
Religious organizations established in 1993
Indian-American culture in Nebraska
Asian-American culture in Nebraska
21st-century Hindu temples